Jordanita anatolica is a moth of the family Zygaenidae. It is found in Nakhchivan, southern Turkey, Cyprus, Syria, Lebanon, Israel, Jordan, Egypt and north-eastern Libya. In the east, the range extends to Iraq and Iran.

The length of the forewings is 8.8–10.5 mm for males and 7.9–9.2 mm for females.

The larvae feed on Echinops spinosus. They mine the leaves of their host plant.

Subspecies
Jordanita anatolica anatolica
Jordanita anatolica kruegeri (Turati, 1930) (Libya, Egypt)

References

C. M. Naumann, W. G. Tremewan: The Western Palaearctic Zygaenidae. Apollo Books, Stenstrup 1999,

External links
Fauna Europaea

Procridinae
Moths described in 1929